= Automotive Dealership Institute =

Coordinates: 33°31′56″N 111°55′31″W

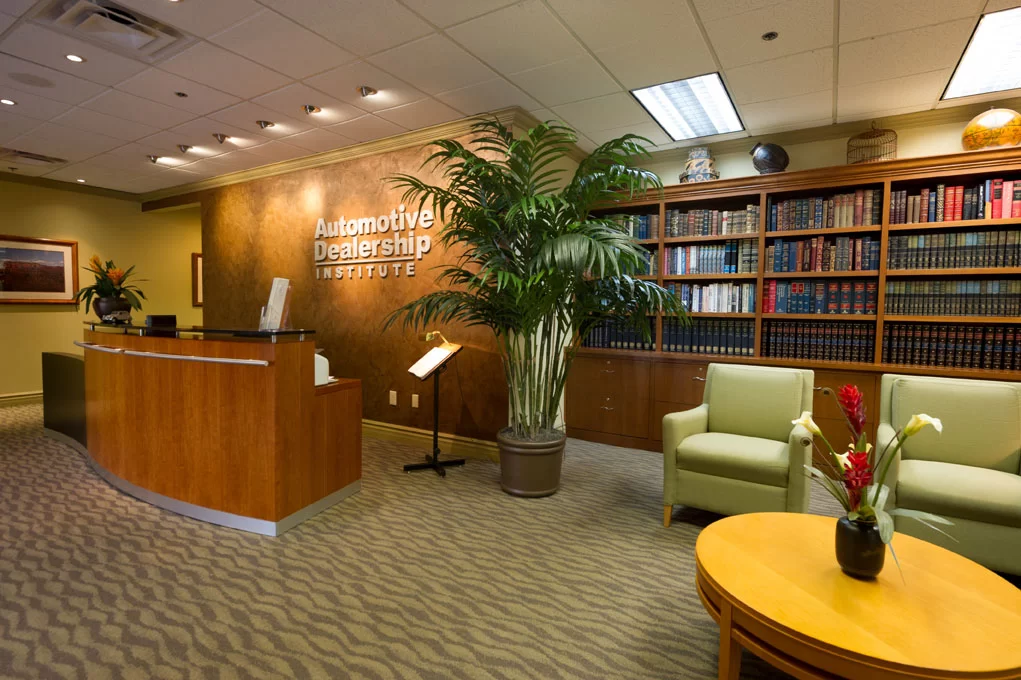

Location
- Scottsdale, Arizona

Information
- Type: private
- Founded: 2004
- Executive director: Alan Algan
- Chancellor: Robert W. Serum
- Website: www.autodealerinstitute.com

Automotive Dealership Institute is an Arizona-based and licensed training program that offers classroom and online instruction in management, finance, and insurance for the auto industry.

== History ==
Automotive Dealership Institute was founded in December 2004. The institute offers management training for automotive dealerships. Alan Algan is Executive Director, and Robert W. Serum is the Chancellor.
